Desislava Radeva is a Bulgarian public figure and the current First Lady of Bulgaria since January 2017, being the wife of President Rumen Radev.

Early life and career

Born Desislava Gencheva in Burgas on 9 July 1969, she studied at the Geo Milev English Language School for secondary school before going on to the University of National and World Economy in Finance and Credit. She also studied at the University of Forestry, Sofia. In her student years, she worked as an assistant to the Minister of Agriculture Rumen Hristov. She continued her career as an office manager in TV shows such as Kanaleto and Hushove. She was subsequently responsible for public relations at the Bulgarian Music Company. Later, she became an assistant to the general manager of Heineken in Bulgaria. In 2016, she took an active part in the November 2016 Bulgarian presidential election, campaigning for her then partner Rumen Radev. In 2017, she founded a non-profit association called the "Living Water of Bulgaria", which carries out activities in the public interest.

Personal life
Radeva married her current husband in 2016. She was previously married to Georgi Svilenski, a Bulgarian engineer, and Member of the National Assembly from the Bulgarian Socialist Party (BSP). She has one son from her 13-year marriage to Svilenski. Besides her native Bulgarian language, she is also fluent in the English and Russian languages. She is a Bulgarian Orthodox.

Honour

Foreign honour
 : Grand Cross of the Order of Merit (30 January 2019)

References

1969 births
Living people
First ladies of Bulgaria
People from Burgas
University of National and World Economy alumni